is a private university in Fukuoka, Fukuoka, Japan. The predecessor of the school was founded in 1954. It was chartered as a junior college in 1957 and became a four-year college in 1965.

External links
 Official website 

Educational institutions established in 1954
Private universities and colleges in Japan
Universities and colleges in Fukuoka Prefecture
1954 establishments in Japan